Miss World 1960, the 10th anniversary of the Miss World pageant, was held on 8 November 1960 at the Lyceum Ballroom in London, United Kingdom. 39 candidates competed for the Miss World. The winner was Norma Cappagli, representing Argentina. She was crowned by racing driver Stirling Moss, who served as one of the judging panel.

Results

Judges
The seven judges has been in the final night competition:

 Rajah Gunsekard (Gunasekera) — Ceylon diplomat
 Oliver Messel —  British artist
 Lady F. Asafu-Adjaye — wife of the Ambassador of Ghana to Great Britain
 Major Stafford W. Somerfield — British journalist
 Fredericka Ann "Bobo" Sigrist — wife of the British film producer Kevin McClory
 Stirling Moss — British' F1 racing driver
 Bernard Delfont — Russian-born British entrepreneur

Contestants
 
  - Norma Gladys Cappagli †
  - Margaret Pasquil Nott
  - Huberte Bax
  - Dalia Monasteros Thornee
  - Maria Edilene Torreão
  - Ma Sen Aye
  - Danica d'Hondt
  - Mary Mavropoulos
  - Lise Bodin
  - Toty Rodríguez
  - Margaretha Schauman
  - Diane Medina
  - Ingrun Helgard Möckel †
  - Kalliopi Geralexi
  - Carina Verbeek
  - Kristín Þorvaldsdóttir
  - Iona Pinto † 
  - Irene Ruth Kane
  - Gila Golan 
  - Layla Rigazzi
  - Eiko Murai
  - Eriny Emile Sebella
  - Jasmine Batty
  - Lee Young-hee
  - Giséle Nicolas Naser
  - Liliane Mueller
  - Rajaobelina Bedovoahangy
  - Carmen Isabel Recalde
  - Grethe Solhoy
  - Denise Muir
  - Jenny Lee Scott
  - Concepción Molinera Palacios
  - Barbro Olsson
  - Teura Bouwens
  - Carmen Lesley Woodcock
  - Nebahat Çehre
  - Hilda Fairclough
  - Judith Ann Achter
  - Beatriz Benítez

Notes

Debuts

Returns
Last competed in 1957:
 
Last competed in 1958:

Withdrawals
  – Luise Kammermair
  – Comfort Kwamena
 
 
 
  – Lena Woo
  – Judith Willoughby
  – Mercedes Ruggia
  – Maricruz Gómez
  – Maria Josebate Silva Santos

Nations not competing
  - Marinka Polhammer Espinoza
  - Lorraine Nawa Jones
  - Elaine Maurath
  - Miriam Maritza Estévez Acevedo

References

External links
 Miss World official website

Miss World
1960 in London
1960 beauty pageants
Beauty pageants in the United Kingdom
November 1960 events in the United Kingdom